Arthur Simmons Stables Historic District, also known as the Clark & Potts Combination Sales Barn, Lee Brothers Barn, B. O. Tucker Stables, and Dincara Stables, is a historic stable complex and national historic district located at Mexico, Audrain County, Missouri.  The district encompasses six contributing buildings and five contributing structures built between 1884 and 1954.  They include the Arthur Simmons Stables (1887, 1943), Maternity Stables (1949), Hook Barn (c. 1935, c. 1948), Farrier's Shed (c. 1949), Storage Shed (c. 1949), Grain Bin #1 and #2 (c. 1949), East and West Tracks, Wood Fencing (c. 1945), and the Arthur Simmons House (1954).  The stables were one of most recognized training centers in the American Saddlebred industry.

It was listed on the National Register of Historic Places in 2004.

References

Historic districts on the National Register of Historic Places in Missouri
Agricultural buildings and structures on the National Register of Historic Places in Missouri
Houses completed in 1954
Buildings and structures in Audrain County, Missouri
National Register of Historic Places in Audrain County, Missouri
2004 establishments in Missouri